David Rudd (born March 13, 1959) is an American cinematographer. He has been nominated for 4 Emmy Awards and 1 MTV Award for Cinematography.

Filmography as Cinematographer

External links

 David Rudd Director Of Photography
 David Rudd Hollywood.Com
 David Rudd InBaseLine
 David Rudd Yahoo Movies
 The Police Website
 The Gray Man Movie Reviews
 Billy Movie Reviews

1959 births
American cinematographers
Living people